Neil Francis MacGroarty (1 May 1888 – 10 August 1971) was a solicitor and a member of the Queensland Legislative Assembly.

Early life
MacGroarty was born in Jane Street, South Brisbane, Queensland, to Irish-born parents Daniel Cannon MacGroarty, inspector of schools, and his wife Anna Maria (née Kearney). Educated at St Joseph's College, Gregory Terrace and Nudgee College, he entered into articles of clerkship with Patrick O'Sullivan before being admitted as a solicitor of the Supreme Court of Queensland in 1911. MacGroarty became O'Sullivan's business partner for eight years and in 1919 he transferred to the bar where he practiced from the old Inns of Court building in Adelaide Street.

Political career
At the 1929 election, MacGroarty, the Country and Progressive National Party candidate, defeated Labor's Myles Ferricks to win the seat of South Brisbane. He was immediately appointed attorney general and in his maiden speech he attracted controversy when, after being interjected, he stated that the Queensland Court of Industrial Arbitration would be "ringbarked" as soon as possible.

In April 1930, a Royal Commission was held into the purchase of the Mungana mines and Chillagoe smelters by the Queensland Government in what became known as the Mungana affair. The former owners included Peter Goddard and Fred Reid as well as then Queensland Premier, 
Ted Theodore and future Premier, Bill McCormack. Macgroarty opened the crown submissions and, after the commissioner, former Justice James Campbell, found the transactions to be fraudulent, MacGroarty, for the crown, sued the four men for £30,000 damages before Chief Justice Sir James Blair of the Supreme Court of Queensland. The four member jury went on to find in favour of the defendants.

In his time as attorney general MacGroarty introduced the Companies Act of 1931, and the controversial Judicial Proceedings (Regulations of Reports) Act of 1931. The latter was regarded as an attempt to protect public morals, but was seen by the Labor Party as a personal vendetta against Brisbane Truth newspaper. By the time of the 1932 election, MacGroarty had fallen out with important Catholic elements and lost his seat to Labor's Vince Gair. Macgroarty left politics bitterly disillusioned and resumed his law practice until his retirement.

Personal life
On 21 December 1929, MacGroarty married Doreen Mary Joseph (died 1985) at St. Mary's Catholic Church, South Brisbane and together had three sons and two daughters. He was captain of the senior football team at Nudgee College and executive-member of the Queensland Rugby Union.

A former president of the Queensland Irish Association and a member of the Johnsonian Club, MacGroarty died at South Brisbane in August 1971. His funeral proceeded from St Ignatius' Church, Toowong, to the Toowong Cemetery.

References

Members of the Queensland Legislative Assembly
1888 births
1971 deaths
Burials at Toowong Cemetery
20th-century Australian politicians